Carlos Alonso Vargas Tenorio (born 14 February 1999) is a Mexican professional footballer who plays as a left-back for Liga MX club Cruz Azul.

Club career

Tijuana
In 2014, Vargas first joined Club Tijuana’s youth academy. In 2017, first-team coach Miguel Herrera promoted 18 year-old Vargas to the team competing in that year’s Clausura tournament.

On March 17, 2017 Vargas made his debut against Santos Laguna. He started the match and played all 90 minutes in a 1–1 draw. He made twelve appearances as Tijuana finished the tournament in first place and managed to reach the semifinals of the playoffs.

América

In June 2017 Vargas joined Club América, reuniting with manager Miguel Herrera. He made his debut on 22 July against Querétaro. He started in the match which ended in a 0–1 defeat.

Cruz Azul
On January 18, 2023, Cruz Azul announced the signing of Vargas from Mazatlán. Vargas made his season debut on February 4, against Tigres UANL and tore his right ACL in the 14th minute of the match.

International career
On 25 October 2018, Vargas was called up by Diego Ramírez to participate in the 2018 CONCACAF U-20 Championship. He would attain an injury during Mexico's first group stage match against Nicaragua and was subsequently ruled out for the rest of the tournament.

Vargas was included in the final roster that participated at the 2018 Toulon Tournament. He would go on to appear in all five matches, as Mexico would go to the final against England, where Mexico lost 1–2.

Vargas was included in the final roster that participated in the 2018 Central American and Caribbean Games. He appeared in two group stage matches as Mexico finished last in their group with one point.

Style of play
Vargas is described as "quick in anticipating opponent's movements and strong in the air."

Honours
América
Liga MX: Apertura 2018
Copa MX: Clausura 2019
Campeón de Campeones: 2019

References

External links
Carlos Vargas Debut Copa MX (Spanish)
Vargas Mexican Promise (Spanish)

1999 births
Living people
Mexican footballers
Association football defenders
Club Tijuana footballers
Club América footballers
Mazatlán F.C. footballers
Liga MX players
Liga Premier de México players
Tercera División de México players
Footballers from Chihuahua
Sportspeople from Ciudad Juárez
Mexico under-20 international footballers